The 2005 FIBA Europe Under-20 Championship for Women Division B was the first edition of the Division B of the Women's European basketball championship for national under-20 teams. It was held in Druskininkai, Lithuania, from 1 to 8 July 2005. Israel women's national under-20 basketball team won the tournament.

Participating teams

Final standings

Results

References

2005
2005–06 in European women's basketball
International youth basketball competitions hosted by Lithuania
FIBA U20
July 2005 sports events in Europe